Misumenops nepenthicola is a species of crab spiders. It lives inside the pitchers of a number of lowland Nepenthes pitcher plants in Malaysia, Indonesia and Singapore.  As such, it is classified as a nepenthephile.  They are slow-moving spiders which do not actively hunt.  Males and females both reach a length of 6 mm.

References

 Clarke, C. 1997. Nepenthes of Borneo.  Natural History Publications (Borneo), Kota Kinabalu, p. 39.

Thomisidae
Spiders described in 1898
Spiders of Asia
Nepenthes infauna